Avraham Melamed (born 29 May 1944) is an Israeli former swimmer. He competed for Israel at the 1964 Summer Olympics and Israel at the 1968 Summer Olympics. Representing Israel at the 1966 Asian Games in Bangkok, Thailand, he won silver medals in the 100 m butterfly and the 4 × 100 m medley relay. He studied at the West Liberty University and was inducted into their swimming Hall of Fame in 1995.

References

External links
 

1944 births
Living people
Israeli male swimmers
Olympic swimmers of Israel
Swimmers at the 1964 Summer Olympics
Swimmers at the 1968 Summer Olympics
People from Tiberias
Asian Games medalists in swimming
Asian Games silver medalists for Israel
Swimmers at the 1966 Asian Games
Medalists at the 1966 Asian Games